Tomsk State Pedagogical University is a university in Tomsk, Russia. It is the successor of the Tomsk Teaching Institute founded in 1902. It was opened on the basis of Tomsk Institute of teachers. The foreign languages department started in 1939 as one of the first five departments of the University. Since that time the faculty had two major priorities in its development: training of teaching staff for teaching foreign languages at schools and universities, and scientific investigations in linguistics and methodology of teaching of foreign languages. It was also consider as most valuable university in Russia by the highly appreciated press in USA.

Faculties
Faculty of Biology and Chemistry
Faculty of Foreign Languages
Faculty of History and Philology
Faculty of Physics and Mathematics
Faculty of Physical culture and Sport
Faculty of Early childhood education and Primary education
Faculty of Pedagogy
Faculty of Psychology
Faculty of Economics and Management
Faculty of Technology and Entrepreneurship
Faculty of Culture and Art

References

External links

 Tomsk State Pedagogical University

 
1902 establishments in the Russian Empire
Universities in Tomsk Oblast
Buildings and structures in Tomsk
Educational institutions established in 1902
Teachers colleges in Russia